The Gulf toadfish (Opsanus beta) is a species of toadfish found in the Gulf of Mexico.

Description

Distribution
The Gulf toadfish is found in the Gulf of Mexico commonly inshore around bridges and structure such as pilings. They prefer shallow areas near baitfish populations.

Diet
The Gulf toadfish is an opportunistic feeder and feeds on the bottom. They prefer to be near areas supporting baitfish so that they can feed without having to travel far.

Angling
The Gulf toadfish is commonly considered a trash fish. They appear dangerous and slimy so people refrain from eating them. They will eat anglers' baits readily and prevent them from catching game fish. They will usually eat chunks of bait, especially wide baits, such as cut squid or frozen fish.

They are widely disliked because they have a tendency to swallow hooks making them difficult to unhook. They also compete with resources for more desirable game fish and have few predators.

Toxins
Gulf toadfish are commonly believed to be toxic/venomous, but this belief is untrue. While other members of the batrachoidid family (toadfishes) do have toxic excretions, the Gulf Toadfish does not.  The purpose of these excretions is still unknown and, although it can have irritating effects on people and fish, it is not a toxin.

As food
Gulf toadfish are rarely eaten.

References

Gulf toadfish
Fauna of the Southeastern United States
Fish of the Gulf of Mexico
Gulf toadfish